The shipova (× Sorbopyrus irregularis  (Münchh.) C.A.Wimm.) is a hybrid of the European pear (Pyrus communis) and the common whitebeam (Sorbus aria). It is a small to medium-sized tree growing to 10–18 m tall (or 4 - 6 m on dwarfing rootstock), with deciduous oval leaves 7–11 cm long and 5–6 cm broad. The fruit is a pome 2.5–3 cm long; it is edible with a sweet, yellowish flesh, which tastes similar to a Nashi pear.

History
The hybrid, known as the Bollwiller pear, first arose at Bollwiller in Alsace, France, before 1612, and has mostly been propagated by grafting since then; it is nearly sterile, only rarely producing any viable seeds. Two successful seedling propagations have been named as the cultivar 'Bulbiformis' and as the species Pyrus malifolia, but shipova trees are not widely cultivated. Shipova is the only known species in the nothogenus × Sorbopyrus (the hybrid genus of Sorbus and Pyrus)

Similar hybrids
Other intergeneric hybrids within tribe Maleae that include Sorbus as one of the parents are:
× Amelasorbus
× Crataegosorbus
× Malosorbus
× Sorbaronia
× Sorbocotoneaster

Alternative genus names
The genus Sorbopyrus (a name published in 1906) has also been known as Bollwilleria Zabel (published 1907), and as Pyraria A.Chev. (published 1925).

References

Bean, W. J. (1980). Trees and Shrubs Hardy in the British Isles, eighth edition.
Wimmer, C.A. (2014). Die Bollweiler Birne × Sorbopyrus irregularis (Münchh.) C.A.Wimm. : Geschichte und Nomenklatur. Zandera 29 (2014), Nr. 2

External links
US Agricultural Research Service: Shipova. 

Hybrid fruit

Maleae